The Australia Rally Championship (ARC) is Australia's leading road motor rally competition. A multi-event national championship has been held each year since 1968.

Competition - to 2010 
The Australia Rally Championship takes in some of the country's most stunning and picturesque locations. The 2010 season starts with Rally Tasmania, the only tarmac round in the championship. Based in the small coastal city of Burnie, Australia's longest-running tarmac rally is celebrating its 30th Anniversary this year.

The second round sees the championship head across the country for the Quit Forest Rally. The rally is based in the coastal tourist town of Busselton, near Margaret River in Western Australia. Many of the rally stages are narrow and tree-lined, and are often covered in the notoriously slippery, ball-bearing gravel.

The third round of the championship takes place in the forest roads in the hills around Coffs Harbour, New South Wales. The Coffs Coast Rally, known for its numerous surface changes, was cancelled in 2009 due to heavy rains and road damage.

The championship then moves to the Rally of South Australia. The rally stages are located in the Barossa Valley, Adelaide Hills and Mount Barker regions, and are within driving distance of the state capital Adelaide. The rally stages are the smoothest and fastest in the championship, making the rally a favourite for competitors and spectators alike.

Round four of the Australia Rally Championship, and also a round of the FIA Asia-Pacific Championship, is the International Rally of Queensland. The stages are held in the forests around the township of Imbil, in the Mary Valley just north of Brisbane. The stages vary between tight and technical and fast and flowing, with many rough sections that give this event a reputation as a potential car-breaker.

The final round of the ARC will be a new round in the state of Victoria. The event is set to based in the town of Drouin, located about 100 kilometres east of Melbourne. The rally stages are to be held mostly in the foothills of Mount Baw Baw, using forestry roads in the Nojoee - Neerim district.

The Championship itself is a highly competitive series, featuring a host of talented teams all racing the clock for the honour of being champion. The competition is often very close, with drivers trading stage times over the gravel and tarmac roads and often finishing just tenths of seconds ahead or behind their rivals. In the forest, the action is thrilling. Cars slide sideways through high-speed corners and dodge and dive over challenging crested roads as the team-work between driver and co-driver is tested to the limit.

Competition classes

The Australia Rally Championship caters to a range of different competitors in the series and with a number of classes and categories; competitors can start rallying at the level that best suits their budget. The outright competition is fought out amongst the names of rallying and is the ultimate test for the competitors at the pointy end of the field. The ARC's top drivers compete in Group N (Production) - cars which have direct links to their road-going counterparts. The ARC also offers opportunities for manufacturers who don't produce Group N cars to build comparable machinery under both the Group N (P) and FIA Super 2000 regulations. Another award that is desirable for competitors to chase is the Privateers Cup for competitors who don't have support from the manufacturer teams. The F16 Championship is the small car category (1600cc, 2WD) and a budget-level place to start rallying. The outright winner of the Championship is an Australian Champion in the small car category and is added to the record books. The Aussie Cup is the Australian award for large cars (over 2500cc) that enables competitors in the big cars to run popular passenger car models such as V6 and V8's. Amongst the outright awards are the opportunities to chase individual class awards that are based on car capacity and specification which gives competitors the opportunity to pursue class victories.

Cars
The more successful cars in recent years of the ARC have been the 4WD 2.0L Turbo models such as the Mitsubishi Lancer Evolutions, Subaru Impreza WRX STIs and the Toyota Corolla ARC-spec cars, which are actually running Toyota Celica GT-Four engines, 4WD system, etc.. Michael Guest and Mark Stacey campaigned a RWD 2.5L normally aspirated Ford Focus during the 2006 season, switching to a Ford Fiesta prepared for the Super 2000 class in 2007. Most of the cars in the privateer fields are of a similar make, but other makes with success have been the Mitsubishi Mirage, Mitsubishi Galant VR-4, Subaru Legacy, Datsun 1600, Datsun 240Z, Nissan Stanza and the Suzuki Swift GTi.

Drivers
As with the cars, it tends to be the factory-entered drivers that take the outright placings. Some of these drivers have been Colin Bond, Greg Carr. George Fury, Ross Dunkerton, Geoff Portman, Scott Pedder, Simon Evans, Neal Bates, the late Possum Bourne and Ed Ordynski. Privateer crews that have enjoyed recent success include Nathan Quinn and Steve Glenney. In 2015 Molly Taylor became the first woman to win a heat in the Australia Rally Championship.

Winners

Australian Rally Champions

* Fred Gocentas co-drove for Greg Carr during the 1978 season while Dawson-Damer co-drove for Colin Bond while also scoring points on one occasion co-driving for Dave Morrow which enabled him to beat Gocentas to the co-driver's title.
** Kate Officer co-drove for David Officer during the 1986 season. 
*** Bill Hayes co-drove for Molly Taylor during the 2017 season. David Calder and Ben Searcy co-drove for Quinn in 2017.

Group N Rally Championship

Australian Manufacturers Champions

Australian Formula 2 Rally Champions

Australian F16 Rally Champions

See also

Motorsport in Australia
List of Australian motor racing series

References

External links
Series Official Web Site

Rally racing series
Rally Championship
Rally competitions in Australia